The women's long jump at the 1962 European Athletics Championships was held in Belgrade, then Yugoslavia, at JNA Stadium on 14 and 15 September 1962.

Medalists

Results

Final
15 September

Qualification
14 September

Participation
According to an unofficial count, 18 athletes from 12 countries participated in the event.

 (1)
 (2)
 (1)
 (2)
 (1)
 (1)
 (2)
 (2)
 (1)
 (2)
 (2)
 (1)

References

Long jump
Long jump at the European Athletics Championships
Euro